The first season of Narcos, an American crime thriller drama web television series produced and created by Chris Brancato, Carlo Bernard, and Doug Miro, follows the story of notorious drug kingpin Pablo Escobar, who became a billionaire through the production and distribution of cocaine, while also focusing on Escobar's interactions with other drug lords, DEA agents, and various opposition entities.

It stars Wagner Moura as Pablo Escobar – a Colombian drug lord and the leader of the Medellín Cartel, with Boyd Holbrook, Pedro Pascal, Joanna Christie, Maurice Compte, André Mattos, Roberto Urbina, Diego Cataño, Jorge A. Jimenez, Paulina Gaitán, Paulina García, Stephanie Sigman, Bruno Bichir, Raúl Méndez and Manolo Cardona playing various real life based characters. The season  was estimated to cost about $25 million dollars, with $2.5 million per episode.

All 10 episodes of the season became available for streaming on Netflix on August 28, 2015, and were met with generally favorable critical reception. Wagner Moura's portrayal of Pablo Escobar earned him widespread critical acclaim including a Best Actor – Television Series Drama nomination at the 73rd Golden Globe Awards, while the season itself was nominated for Best Television Series – Drama at the ceremony and received Writers Guild of America Award for Television: Episodic Drama, British Academy Television Award for Best International Programme and three Primetime Emmy Award nominations. The series was renewed for a second season, which premiered on September 2, 2016, with 10 episodes.

Cast and characters

Main
 Wagner Moura as Pablo Escobar – a Colombian drug lord and the leader of the Medellín Cartel 
 Boyd Holbrook as Steve Murphy – a DEA agent tasked with bringing down Escobar
 Pedro Pascal as Javier Peña – a DEA agent, who is on Murphy's task force
 Joanna Christie as Connie Murphy – Steve's wife, a nurse who works in the local hospital
 Maurice Compte as Horacio Carrillo – a Colombian police chief, based on Colonel Hugo Martínez  
 André Mattos as Jorge Ochoa – founding member and former leader of the Medellín Cartel  
 Roberto Urbina as Fabio Ochoa – a high-ranking member of the Medellín Cartel 
 Diego Cataño as Juan Diego "La Quica" Díaz – an assassin routinely hired by the Medellín, based on Dandeny Muñoz Mosquera
 Jorge A. Jiménez as Roberto "Poison" Ramos – a hitman hired by the Medellín Cartel, who often argues with Quica about personal death counts  
 Paulina Gaitán as Tata Escobar – Escobar's wife, based on María Henao
 Paulina García as Hermilda Gaviria – Escobar's mother, a former Colombian schoolteacher 
 Stephanie Sigman as Valeria Vélez – a Colombian journalist who also serves as Pablo Escobar's mistress, based on Virginia Vallejo  
 Bruno Bichir as Fernando Duque – a Colombian lawyer who represents Pablo Escobar, acting as his liaison with the Colombian government, based on Guido Parra.
 Raúl Méndez as César Gaviria – a Colombian economist and politician and the 28th President of Colombia
 Manolo Cardona as Eduardo Sandoval – the Vice Minister of Justice in President Gaviria's administration

Recurring
 Luis Guzmán as Gonzalo Rodríguez Gacha – founding member and former leader of the Medellín Cartel  
 Juan Pablo Raba as Gustavo Gaviria – Escobar's cousin and one of the founding members of the Medellín Cartel  
 Richard T. Jones as CIA Officer – a CIA officer, also on Murphy's task force  
 Ana de la Reguera as Elisa Álvarez – the co-leader of guerrilla faction 19th of April Movement (M-19) 
 Patrick St. Esprit as Colonel Lou Wysession – a Marine officer fighting against communism
 Danielle Kennedy as Ambassador Noonan – a United States Ambassador deployed to Colombia under Ronald Reagan 
 Alberto Ammann as Hélmer "Pacho" Herrera – a Colombian drug lord and high-ranking member of the Cali Cartel
 Gabriela de la Garza as Diana Turbay – a Colombian journalist who was kidnapped by the Medellín cartel
 Luis Gnecco as "La Cucaracha" or Mateo 'Cockroach' Moreno – a Chilean drug chemist who flees Chile and join forces with Pablo Escobar before being executed by Escobar for selling information due to personal dispute.
 Julián Díaz as El Negro or "Blackie" (né Nelson Hernández) – a member of the Medellín Cartel, who is frequently seen by Escobar's side (in real life, Escobar had a close friend named Jorge "El Negro" Pabón)
 Juan Sebastián Calero as Navegante – a violent associate of the Cali Cartel who works as their top henchman
 Jon-Michael Ecker as El León or "The Lion" – a childhood friend of Escobar's who becomes his first drug smuggler into Miami and subsequently runs Escobar's Miami operations
 Cristina Umaña as Judy Moncada – a former leader in the Medellín Cartel who, after Escobar murdered her husband Kiko, led a breakaway cartel and allied with the Cali Cartel and Los Pepes; she is based on the real-life Dolly Moncada  
 Christian Tappan as Gerardo 'Kiko' Moncada, Escobar's business partner
 Orlando Valenzuela as Fernando Galeano, Escobar's business partner    
 Juan Riedinger as Carlos Lehder – Lion's contact in the United States, tasked with distributing the cocaine 
 Thaddeus Phillips as Agent Owen – a CIA agent on the Colombia task force  
 Ariel Sierra as Sureshot – one of Escobar's sicarios  
 Carolina Gaitán as Marta Ochoa – the Ochoas' sister, who is kidnapped by M-19  
 Laura Perico as Marina Ochoa – the Ochoas' sister, who has an affair with Escobar's cousin Gustavo  
 Vera Mercado as Ana Gaviria – the wife of César Gaviria and the First Lady of Colombia
 Juan Murcia as Juan Pablo Escobar, Escobar's young son 
Alejandro Buitrago as Velasco
Jorge Monterosa as Trujillo
Andres Felipe as General Jaramillo
Luis Miguel Hurtado as El Paisa, an Escobar employee and truck driver
Juan Pablo Espinosa as Luis Carlos Galán – a Colombian politician whom Gaviria works as a personal secretary, who runs for Presidency before getting assassinated.

Episodes

Reception

Critical response
The first season received generally favorable reviews from critics. Rotten Tomatoes a review aggregator surveyed 45 reviews and judged 78% to be positive. The site reads, "Narcos lacks sympathetic characters, but pulls in the viewer with solid acting and a story that's fast-paced enough to distract from its familiar outline." On Metacritic, Season 1 holds a score of 77 out of 100, based on 19 critics, indicating "Generally favorable reviews". IGN gave the first season a 7.8 out of 10 score calling it "Good" and reads "It's a true-to-life account, sometimes to a fault, of the rise of Pablo Escobar and the hunt that brought him down laced with stellar performances and tension-filled stand-offs. Its blend of archival footage reminds us that the horrors depicted really happened, but also manage to present an Escobar that is indefensible but frighteningly sympathetic."

The season received generally positive reviews from many media outlets. Writing for The Philadelphia Inquirer, Tirdad Derakhshani reviewed the season positively, calling it "Intense, enlightening, brilliant, unnerving, and addictive, Narcos is high-concept drama at its finest." The New York Posts, Robert Rorke said, "Catching Escobar then becomes an exciting and suspenseful story arc, and makes Narcos the first cool show of the new season." Joshua Alston of The A.V. Club judged "Narcos is frequently funny and just stylized enough to amplify the entertainment value without minimizing the gravity of the subject matter. It’s an eminently bingeable show even as it makes a strong case for moderate consumption." Television critic, Tim Goodman of The Hollywood Reporter also reviewed the series positively saying, "The series begins to find its pacing not long after, and we see the strength of Moura’s acting, which to his credit never races, in the early going, toward over-the-top menace or the drug-lord cliches we're all used to at this point. Credit also the fact that Padilha brings a documentary feel to Narcos."

Nancy deWolf Smith of The Wall Street Journal wrote, "The omniscient-narrator device works very well for a complex story spanning many years and varied sets of players." Critic Neil Genzlinger of The New York Times said, "It’s built on sharp writing and equally sharp acting, as any good series needs to be." The San Francisco Chronicles David Wiegand wrote, "Virtually every performance is equal to the quality of the script, but Moura is especially compelling as he manipulates the seeming incongruities of Escobar’s character to heighten his aura of unpredictable menace.... Brancato does make one significant misstep by having the entire series heavily narrated by Murphy." Chief TV critic Brian Lowry of Variety also lauded the series saying, "The sparely told project weaves together a taut, gripping narrative, in stark contrast with the flatness of its characters and color scheme. All told, this Gaumont production is the kind of binge-worthy TV addiction that Netflix was born to import."

Some were more critical towards the show including chief television critic Mary McNamara of Los Angeles Times who wrote, "It's a grand if inconsistent experiment that, from the moment it opens with a definition of magic realism, wears its considerable ambitions on its sleeve." New York Daily Newss David Hinckley, moderately reviewed the season and said, "One of the strengths of Narcos is its refusal to paint anyone as purely good or bad." Writing for IndieWire, Liz Shannon Miller said, "An unlikeable character, no matter the circumstances, remains unlikeable, but an unlikeable character trumps a bland blonde man whose position of authority appears to be his only really interesting character trait, no matter how much voice-over he utters." Josh Bell of Las Vegas Weekly quipped, "Mostly the show is a breezy tour through history, sometimes informative but rarely affecting."

Accolades

References

External links

 
 

Narcos
2015 American television seasons